Solnice is a town in Rychnov nad Kněžnou District in the Hradec Králové Region of the Czech Republic. It has about 2,200 inhabitants.

Administrative parts
The village of Ještětice is an administrative part of Solnice.

History
The first written mention of Solnice is from 1321. It was probably founded on the trade route from western and southern lands to the Baltic region.

References

External links

Populated places in Rychnov nad Kněžnou District
Cities and towns in the Czech Republic